Kochanowice  is a village in Lubliniec County, Silesian Voivodeship, in southern Poland. It is the seat of the gmina (administrative district) called Gmina Kochanowice.

The village has a population of 1,944.

References

Kochanowice

it:Kochanowice